Leif Erikson (c.980 – c.1020) was an Icelandic explorer who was the first European known to have discovered North America.

Leif Ericson or alternative spellings may also refer to:

People
 Leif Erickson (actor) (1911–1986), American actor
 Leif Erickson (politician) (1906–1998), American politician
 Leif Eriksson (footballer) (born 1942), Swedish footballer
 Leif Eriksson (pipemaker) (born 1946), developer of the revived Swedish bagpipe
 Leif Ericsson (swimmer) (born 1955), Swedish swimmer

Other
 , a Canadian passenger and vehicle ferry
 Leif Erikson (band), a British indie band
 Leif Erikson (ship), a 1926 Viking ship replica
 Leif Erickson, Hagbard Celine's submarine in The Illuminatus! Trilogy
 Leiv Eiriksson, an oil platform owned by Ocean Rig
 "Leif Erikson", a song from the album Turn On The Bright Lights by rock band Interpol

See also
 Leif Eriksen (disambiguation)